Stade Rivière Salée is a football stadium located in Noumea, New Caledonia. The stadium has a capacity of 3,000.  It hosts the home games of a number of local football teams, including AS Kirikitr, as well as serving as a host venue for the 2011 Pacific Games men's football tournament. 
The stadium hosted every Group "A" match at this tournament from 27 August 2011 to 5 September 2011. In hosting Group "A" matches, the Stade Rivière Salée held the games of American Samoa, Guam, Solomon Islands, Tuvalu and Vanuatu.

References

Football venues in New Caledonia
Buildings and structures in Nouméa
Sport in Nouméa